Celebrated Living is a free, bi-monthly in-flight magazine available on American Airlines flights in First and Business Class, and in American Airlines Admirals Clubs worldwide.

History and profile
Celebrated Living was established in 1999. The first issue appeared on 1 October of that year. The magazine is published bi-monthly, with issues for January/February, March/April, May/June, July/August, September/October, and November/December, reaching 4.9 million premium class passengers with each issue.

The magazine was published by American Airlines Publishing and is based in Fort Worth, Texas. In 2014, American Airlines appointed Ink as the new publisher of Celebrated Living. The revamped magazine contains new editorial sections focused on luxury, in the form of property, style and culture topics.

Celebrated Living is available to readers both in inflight and in the lounges, via the print version; as well as in digital editions for mobile devices, tablets and online.

See also
American Way

References

External links 
Celebrated Living Magazine Website
Ink Global Website

American Airlines
Lifestyle magazines published in the United States
Quarterly magazines published in the United States
Free magazines
Inflight magazines
Magazines established in 1999
Magazines published in Florida
Tourism magazines
1999 establishments in Florida